Elachista fuscibasella is a moth of the family Elachistidae. It is found in Spain and Portugal.

References

fuscibasella
Moths described in 1915
Moths of Europe